Qaraoğlan (also, Karaoglan and Piraza-Karaoglan) is a village and municipality in the Agdash Rayon of Azerbaijan.  It has a population of 408.

References 

Populated places in Agdash District